Francis Fernández (or Ferdinand) de Capillas (15 August 1607 – 15 January 1648) was a Spanish Dominican friar who went as a missionary to Asia. He died in China as a martyr. He was canonized by Pope John Paul II on 1 October 2000, as one of the 120 Martyrs of China.

De Capillas is honored by the Holy See as the protomartyr among the missionaries in China, and is considered the glory and pride of the Dominican Order.

Biography
De Capillas was born in Baquerín de Campos, Palencia, Spain, on 14 August 1607. At the age of 17 he entered the Order of Preachers, receiving the religious habit in the Dominican Priory of St. Paul in Valladolid. While still a deacon he was sent by his Order to do missionary work in the Philippines, landing in Manila during February 1631. Shortly after his arrival he was ordained as a priest. De Capillas remained there for the next decade, working alongside his fellow friars. His own field of labor was the district of Tuao, Cagayan Valley, on the island of Luzon.

De Capillas considered that time spent in the Philippines as a period of preparation for a mission to China. At the Provincial Chapter held by the friars of the Order in Manila in 1641, he was given permission to transfer to the Order's mission there, soon transferring to that island, along with a friend, Francisco Díez. He was one of the last Spanish missionaries in Taiwan before they were ousted from the island by the Dutch later that same year.

The two friars arrived in the Province of Fujian, on mainland China, in March 1642, where they joined a fellow Dominican who had survived an earlier period of persecution. They then engaged in evangelization among the Chinese people of the region, especially in the cities of Fogan (Fu'an) and Ting-Moyang Ten. They were so successful that they were able to establish a community of the Third Order of Saint Dominic. On 4 November 1644, there was a huge change of fortune for the mission. That day, his friend Francisco Diez died of natural causes. Later the same day, the Manchurians invaded the city of Fuan, where the missionaries were based, in their conquest of the Ming Dynasty. The new dynasty was hostile to Christianity and immediately began to persecute the Christians.

On 13 November 1647, De Capillas was captured while returning from Fogan, where he had gone to administer the sacraments to a sick person. Enduring many insults, he was taken to the worst local prison, where he suffered the torture of having his ankles crushed while being dragged. He was scourged, repeatedly bloodied, but he endured the tortures without cries of pain, so that judges and torturers were surprised at the end. He was moved, almost dying, to a prison where they locked up those criminals condemned to death. His conduct was uplifting, and aroused the admiration of others sentenced to death and even the prison guards themselves, who allowed food to be brought to him, that he not die of hunger.

While in prison, he wrote

On 15 January 1648 De Capillas was sentenced to death on charges of disseminating false doctrines and inciting the people against the new Emperor. His death sentence, by decapitation, was carried out at Fogan the same day. He thus became the first martyr within the vast Chinese empire.

Veneration
De Capillas was beatified by Pope Pius X, 2 May 1909, along with 14 Chinese laypeople who had also died as martyrs. He was canonized as part of a group of 120 martyrs of China on 1 October 2000, by Pope John Paul II. Their collective memory is remembered on 9 July, while the feast day of Francis Fernández de Capillas is observed on 15 January. He is considered a protomartyr by the Holy See.

See also

 List of saints

References

1607 births
1648 deaths
People from the Province of Palencia
Spanish Roman Catholic saints
Spanish Dominicans
Dominican martyrs
Dominican saints
17th-century Spanish Roman Catholic priests
Martyred Roman Catholic priests
Roman Catholic missionaries in China
Executed Spanish people
17th-century Roman Catholic martyrs
Canonizations by Pope John Paul II
17th-century Christian saints
People executed by the Qing dynasty by decapitation